Gandhi Maidan or Gandhi Maidan Marg is one of the most important thoroughfares in Patna, India. It is a historical place and is considered as a landmark of the city. Gandhi Maidan is the main market and commercial area of Patna with Ashok Rajpath which starts from Gandhi Maidan and Dak Bungalow Crossing and Bailey Road besides Frazer Road, Exhibition Road, Boring Road, and Boring Canal Road. There are many important institutes that have developed around the area of Gandhi Maidan.

Landmarks around Gandhi Maidan
The Gandhi Maidan lies in the hub of the city of Patna. There are many places around the sprawling grounds that one can visit. Within a distance of half a kilometer lies the granary of Golghar that was built in 1786 by the British. The Golghar Falls is also located there. The Patna Sahib Gurudwara is 11 km away from Gandhi Maidan. There are many educational institutes that developed in this region. Some of the schools and colleges near Gandhi Maidan are:

A. N. Sinha Institute for Social Studies
St. Xavier's High School
Women's Training College affiliated under the Patna University
Magadh Mahila College 

Owing to the central location of the grounds, many hotels and office buildings are stationed around it. One of the most important office building is the Biscoman Bhavan which houses offices of the Nalanda Open University and the East Central Railway of Patna.

The Gandhi Maidan is an important landmark of Patna and has its own historical, economic and political value.

North
Shri Krishna Memorial Hall
Christ Church Diocesan School, Patna
Kargil Chowk
Gandhi Sangrahalaya
Patna International Convention Centre

East
Mona Multiplex
NIFT Patna
Regent theatre
Gandhi Maidan Police Station (Bihar Police HQ)
Udyog Bhawan

West
Biscomaun Bhawan
Srikrishna Science Centre
St. Xavier's High School, Patna
State Bank of India, Building
Nalanda Open University
Shahid Pir Ali Park

South
Twin Towers
Reserve Bank of India, Patna
Maurya Lok

South-East
Kalidas Rangalaya

See also
Gandhi Maidan

References

Tourist attractions in Patna
Neighbourhoods in Patna
Economy of Patna